Lick was an American band on Chicago's Invisible Records in the 1990s. Members have played with Pigface, The Final Cut, Project Elf, Sister Machine Gun and more. The band released two albums, Breech and Heap, in the 1990s.

Members
The band's members include:

Alex Welz
John Quesenberry (aka Furly)
James Conterberry (aka Big Man)
Brian Chrisman (aka Brain) 
Jason McNinch
Kurt Komraus (aka cr33py)
Gerald Dowd (aka Uncle G)

The band also sometimes includes Timothy R Zuellig, Yvette Lera, Bob Jones, Martin Atkins, Mike Carnahan, and Vincent Grech.

Discography
Breech - 1996, Invisible Records
Heap - 1997, Invisible Records

External links
Invisible Records

Musical groups from Chicago